Gniewkowo may refer to:

Locations 
Gniewkowo, town in Kuyavian-Pomeranian Voivodeship, Poland
Gmina Gniewkowo, municipality in Kuyavian-Pomeranian Voivodeship, Poland
Gniewkowo, village in Greater Poland Voivodeship, Poland
Gniewkowo, village in Masovian Voivodeship, Poland
Gniewkowo, part of village of Sągnity in Bartoszyce County, Warmian-Masurian Voivodeship, Poland
Gniewkowo, part of village of Gronowo, Mrągowo County, Warmian-Masurian Voivodeship, Poland

States 
 Duchy of Gniewkowo, 14th century duchy

Events 
 Battle of Gniewkowo, 1375 battle of Władysław the White's rebellion